Menai Bay is located on the southwestern coast of Unguja island (Zanzibar Island), in the Zanzibar Archipelago in Tanzania.

Geography
It is an 8 km wide bay on the Zanzibar Strait of the Western Indian Ocean.

The long coastline of Menai Bay has nineteen villages, with a total population of around 17,000. The villages are within the Unguja South Region of Zanzibar.

The Menai Bay Conservation Area is a marine reserve protecting the habitats and biota of the bay area.

References

External links 
Conservation information
Jocara.net: info and map

Bays of Tanzania
Bays of the Indian Ocean
Bodies of water of Zanzibar
Unguja South Region